The Alcorn State Braves basketball team is the men's basketball team that represents Alcorn State University in Lorman, Mississippi, United States.  The school's team currently competes in the Southwestern Athletic Conference.

Postseason results

NCAA tournament results
The Braves have appeared in the NCAA tournament six times. The Braves rank third in the SWAC for most NCAA appearances. Their record is 3–6, with their three wins being tied with Texas Southern for the most of any SWAC team. They are the only SWAC team to receive a top ten seed in the tournament (in 1980, the SWAC's first year in the tournament), and one of two (along with Southern) to advance to the regional quarterfinals (the round of 32).

NIT results
The Braves have appeared in the National Invitation Tournament (NIT) four times. Their record is 1–4.

NAIA results
The Braves have appeared in one NAIA Tournament (NAIA). Their NAIA record is 0–1.

References

External links
Team website